Gema Pascual Torrecilla (born 12 January 1979) is a track and road cyclist from Spain. She represented her nation at the 2004 Summer Olympics in the Women's points race.

References

External links
 profile at Cyclingarchives.com

1979 births
Spanish female cyclists
Living people
Cyclists at the 2004 Summer Olympics
Olympic cyclists of Spain
Cyclists from Madrid